Cymatoderma elegans is a fungus species in the genus Cymatoderma.

 Name brought to synonymy
 Cymatoderma elegans subsp. infundibuliforme (Klotzsch) Boidin 1960, a synonym of Cymatoderma infundibuliforme

References

External links 
 

 
 Cymatoderma elegans at mycobank.org (retrieved 9 April 2016)

Meruliaceae
Fungi described in 1840
Biota of Indonesia